Ancízar López López was a Colombian politician, born in Quindio. He was a representative, and as senator he developed the project for the creation of the Quindio Department, becoming its first governor when created.   

According to police reports, on April 11, 2002, he was kidnapped by the National Liberation Army (ELN). For several months there was no news about his condition, but it was learned that he eventually died in an unknown location, probably due to complications of an unattended kidney failure. His body was finally turned over to the Red Cross. 

The national government declared two days of grief. An avenue and a cenotaph were built in the city of Armenia in his honor.

See also
List of kidnappings
List of solved missing person cases

References

1926 births
2005 deaths
Kidnapped politicians
Kidnapped Colombian people
Colombian governors
Mayors of places in Colombia
Colombian Liberal Party politicians
Presidents of the Senate of Colombia